Phil Borges (born 1942) is a social documentary photographer and filmmaker.

For over twenty-five years Phil Borges has been documenting indigenous and tribal cultures, striving to create an understanding of the challenges they face. His work is exhibited in museums and galleries worldwide, and his award-winning books, which have been published in four languages, include Tibetan Portrait, Enduring Spirit, and Women Empowered and Tibet: Culture on the Edge. He has hosted television documentaries on indigenous cultures for Discovery and National Geographic channels. Phil also lectures and teaches internationally.

Phil's recent project, Crazywise, explores cultural differences with respect to consciousness, mental illness and the relevance of Shamanic traditional practices and beliefs to those of us living in the modern world.

Phil's program Women Empowered has produced several short documentaries, a book and an exhibition highlighting some of the extraordinary women worldwide who are breaking through gender barriers and conventions in order to enhance the well-being of their communities.

In 2000 Phil founded Bridges to Understanding, an on-line classroom program that connects youth worldwide through digital storytelling in order to enhance cross-cultural understanding and help build a sense of global citizenship in youth. He also co-founded Blue Earth Alliance, a 501(c)(3) nonprofit that sponsors photographic projects focusing on endangered cultures and threatened environments.

Phil Borges is a Fellow of the International League of Conservation Photographers.

Notable works
Books:
Enduring Spirit
Tibetan Portrait
The Gift
Women Empowered (Inspiring Change in the Emerging World)

Collections:
Spirit of Place

References

External links
 Official Phil Borges website
 Crazywise film website
 Crazywise short clips
 Women Empowered: book, films, exhibition
 Stirring the Fire: A Global Movement to Empower Women and Girls
 BRIDGES to Understanding website
 
 TEDxSanJuanIsland 2015: Crazywise - A Traditional Approach to Mental Illness
 TEDxUMKC 2014: Psychosis or Spiritual Awakening
 TEDxRainier 2012: Myths, Shamans and Seers
 TED 2006: Documenting Endangered Cultures
 Phil Borges Vimeo channel

American photographers
1942 births
Living people